WCM may stand for:

 Warner Chappell Music, an American music publishing company and a subsidiary of the Warner Music Group
 Wave characteristic method, a model used in fluid dynamics
 WCM, a radio station operated by the University of Texas at Austin under that call sign from 1922 to 1925; now licensed to Houston as KTRH
 WCMH-TV, an NBC-affiliated television station in Columbus, Ohio, United States
 Web content management
 West Coast Magazine, a Scottish literary publication
 Wisden Cricket Monthly, a UK-based cricket magazine
 Woman Candidate Master, a World Federation chess title
 World Championship Motorsports, a Grand Prix motorcycle team
 WCM (Wide DC electric mixed), a classification of Indian locomotives

See also
 WC (disambiguation)
 WCMS (disambiguation)